BookCorpus (also sometimes referred to as the Toronto Book Corpus) is a dataset consisting of the text of around 11,000 unpublished books scraped from the Internet. It was the main corpus used to train the initial version of OpenAI's GPT, and has been used as training data for other early large language models including Google's BERT. The dataset consists of around 985 million words, and the books that comprise it span a range of genres, including romance, science fiction, and fantasy.

The corpus was introduced in a 2015 paper by researchers from the University of Toronto and MIT titled "Aligning Books and Movies: Towards Story-like Visual Explanations by Watching Movies and Reading Books". The authors described it as consisting of "free books written by yet unpublished authors". The dataset was initially hosted on a University of Toronto webpage. An official version of the original dataset is no longer publicly available, though at least one substitute, BookCorpusOpen, has been created. Though not documented in the original 2015 paper, the site from which the corpus's books were scraped is now known to be Smashwords.

References

 
Datasets in machine learning
English corpora